Iridomyrmex mapesi is an extinct species of ant in the genus Iridomyrmex. Described by Wilson in 1985 in the United States, the fossil found is in a considered poor condition

References

†
Hymenoptera of North America
Fossil taxa described in 1985
Fossil ant taxa